Vyshnivets (translit. Vyshnivets’) is an urban-type settlement in Kremenets Raion (district) of the Ternopil Oblast (province) of western Ukraine. It hosts the administration of Vyshnivets settlement hromada, one of the hromadas of Ukraine. Population: 

Vyshnivets is better known as a family estate of the Polish royal house of Wiśniowiecki (originally Ruthenian princes), which is known for switching from Eastern Orthodoxy to Catholicism (as part of Polonization) as well as the Cossack Hetman Dmytro "Baida" Vyshnevetsky, who established the first Zaporizhian Sich on the island of Small (Mala) Khortytsia on the Dnipro River in 1552 in defense of the lands.

History

Early History, to 1939
The area was first mentioned in 1395 soon after annexation of the Kingdom of Galicia-Volhynia by the Kingdom of Poland when the first defensive castle was constructed in the area by Dmytro Korybut who had acquired the land from Great Prince Vitautas

The town is located on the Horyn River, a right tributary of the Prypiat. Before World War II the village was located in Poland.

The town served as a family seat of the Polish princely Wiśniowiecki family, as of the 15th century, and received its name from the family.  The town was noted for its extensive cherry orchards.  In the mid-1500s, one of the family's descendants, Dmytro Vyshnevetsky (1516-1563),  was distinguished by his service to Ivan the Terrible.   His grandson, Jeremi Wiśniowiecki, also known as Yarema Vyshnevetsky (1612-1651) was also a distinguished military commander. During the time of the leadership of Princes Michael and Valusah Wiśniowiecki, as of 1674, the town was on the verge of becoming a Russian capital.

Architectural landmarks in the town include a 15th-century Vyshnivets Palace; and palace and park, constructed in the 18th century by the Vyshnevetskyi family.

1939-1945

The town fell in the Wołyń Voivodeship of the Second Polish Republic during the Intewar Era, before falling to the Soviets in 1939. From 1941, it has been associated with the Holocaust.  Prior to the commencement of World War II, approximately 5,000 Jewish people were residents of the town.  The town was directly in the path of the German invasion of Russia in June 1941, following the repudiation by Germany of the Ribbentrop-Molotov Pact.

On August 11–12, 1942, German troops and Ukrainian Auxiliary Police executed nearly 2,700 Jewish men, women and children.  Of those executed, approximately 900 were children.  It is estimated that less than 100 of the town's Jewish residents ultimately survived the Holocaust.

In February 1944, the Ukrainian Insurgent Army attacked the monastery of Barefoot Carmelites in Vyshnivets, about 300 people, monks and people who wanted to hide in the monastery were murdered. The identity of 45 murdered people was established, the other victims remain nameless.

Post-1945
In 1960, Vyshnivets was changed from the status of a village, to that of an Urban-type settlement.  The population of the town was 3,469 as of 1994.

Until 18 July 2020, Vyshnivets belonged to Zbarazh Raion. The raion was abolished in July 2020 as part of the administrative reform of Ukraine, which reduced the number of raions of Ternopil Oblast to three. The area of Zbarazh Raion was split between Kremenets and Ternopil Raions, with Vyshnivets being transferred to Kremenets Raion.

See also
 Wiśniowiec massacres

References

External links
ShtetLinks - Vishnevets at JewishGen
 
 
 
 
 
 

Urban-type settlements in Kremenets Raion
Wiśniowiecki family
Volhynian Voivodeship (1569–1795)
Shtetls
Mass murder in 1942
Holocaust locations in Ukraine